Tarragon (Artemisia dracunculus), also known as estragon, is a species of perennial herb in the family Asteraceae. It is widespread in the wild across much of Eurasia and North America and is cultivated for culinary and medicinal purposes.

One subspecies, Artemisia dracunculus var. sativa, is cultivated to use the leaves as an aromatic culinary herb. In some other subspecies, the characteristic aroma is largely absent. Informal names for distinguishing the variations include "French tarragon" (best for culinary use), "Russian tarragon," and "wild tarragon" (covers various states).

The flowers are produced in small capitula  diameter, each capitulum containing up to 40 yellow or greenish-yellow florets. French tarragon, however, seldom produces any flowers (or seeds). Some tarragon plants produce seeds that are generally sterile. Others produce viable seeds. Tarragon has rhizomatous roots that it uses to spread and readily reproduce.

Cultivation 

French tarragon is the variety used for cooking in the kitchen and is not grown from seed, as the flowers are sterile; instead, it is propagated by root division.

Russian tarragon (A. dracunculoides L.) can be grown from seed but is much weaker in flavor when compared to the French variety. However, Russian tarragon is a far more hardy and vigorous plant, spreading at the roots and growing over a meter tall. This tarragon actually prefers poor soils and happily tolerates drought and neglect. It is not as intensely aromatic and flavorsome as its French cousin, but it produces many more leaves from early spring onwards that are mild and good in salads and cooked food. Russian tarragon loses what flavor it has as it ages and is widely considered useless as a culinary herb, though it is sometimes used in crafts. The young stems in early spring can be cooked as an asparagus substitute. Horticulturists recommend that Russian tarragon be grown indoors from seed and planted in summer. The spreading plants can be divided easily.

A better substitute for Russian tarragon is Mexican tarragon (Tagetes lucida), also known as Mexican mint marigold, Texas tarragon, or winter tarragon. It is much more reminiscent of French tarragon, with a hint of anise. Although not in the same genus as the other tarragons, Mexican tarragon has a more robust flavor than Russian tarragon that does not diminish significantly with age. It can not however be grown as a perennial in cold climates.

Health 

Tarragon has a flavor and odor profile reminiscent of anise due largely to the presence of estragole, a known carcinogen and teratogen in mice. However, a European Union investigation concluded that the danger of estragole is minimal, even at 100–1,000 times the typical consumption seen in humans. Estragole concentration in fresh tarragon leaves is about 2900 mg/kg.

Uses

Culinary use 

In Iran, tarragon is used as a side dish in sabzi khordan (fresh herbs), or in stews and Persian-style pickles, particularly khiar shoor (pickled cucumbers).

Tarragon is one of the four fines herbes of French cooking and is particularly suitable for chicken, fish, and egg dishes. Tarragon is the main flavoring component of Béarnaise sauce. Fresh, lightly bruised tarragon sprigs are steeped in vinegar to produce tarragon vinegar. Pounded with butter, it produces an excellent topping for grilled salmon or beef.

Tarragon is used to flavor a popular carbonated soft drink in the countries of Armenia, Azerbaijan, Georgia (where it originally comes from), and, by extension, Russia, Ukraine and Kazakhstan. The drink, named Tarkhun, is made out of sugar, carbonated water, and, most importantly, tarragon leaves which give it its signature green color. 

Tarragon is one of the main ingredients in Chakapuli, a Georgian national dish.

In Slovenia, tarragon is used in a variation of the traditional nut roll sweet cake, called potica. In Hungary, a popular chicken soup is flavored with tarragon.

Chemistry 
Gas chromatography/mass spectrometry analysis has revealed that A. dracunculus oil contains predominantly phenylpropanoids such as estragole (16.2%), methyl eugenol (35.8%), and trans-anethole (21.1%). The other major constituents were terpenes and terpenoids, including α-trans-ocimene (20.6%), limonene (12.4%), α-pinene (5.1%), allo-ocimene (4.8%), methyl eugenol (2.2%), β-pinene (0.8%), α-terpinolene (0.5%), bornyl acetate (0.5%) and bicyclogermacrene (0.5%). The organic compound capillin was initially isolated from Artemisia capillaris in 1956.

cis-Pellitorin, an isobutyramide eliciting a pungent taste, has been isolated from the tarragon plant.

Quotes
James Andrew Beard, American cookbook author, teacher, syndicated columnist, and television personality, was quoted as saying, "I believe that if ever I had to practice cannibalism, I might manage if there were enough tarragon around."

Fernand Point, a French chef and restaurateur, was quoted as saying, "A Bearnaise sauce is simply an egg yolk, a shallot, a little tarragon vinegar, and butter, but it takes years of practice for the result to be perfect."

Name

The species name, means "little dragon," and the plant seems to be so named due to its coiled roots. See Artemisia for the genus name derivative.

References

External links 

 Flora of Pakistan: Artemisia dracunculus
 "Tarragon" at Purdue Guide to Medicinal and Aromatic Plants
 

Artemisia (genus)
Herbs
Plants described in 1753
Flora of Europe
Flora of Asia
Flora of North America
Medicinal plants